The second season of Cold Case, an American television series, began airing on October 3, 2004 and concluded on May 22, 2005. Season two regular cast members include Kathryn Morris, Danny Pino, John Finn, Thom Barry and Jeremy Ratchford.

Cast

Episodes

References

2004 American television seasons
2005 American television seasons
Cold Case seasons